Gary Ryan (born 12 June 1972 in Kilcommon, Tipperary) is a former Irish sprinter who specialised in the 200 metres. On retirement he worked for the Irish athletics association as Director of Coaching before leaving in January 2009 for a position with the National University of Ireland, Galway.

Ryan won the bronze medal in 4 x 400 metres relay at the 2004 World Indoor Championships, together with teammates Robert Daly, David Gillick and David McCarthy.

His personal best time is 20.67 seconds, achieved in August 1997 in Catania.

Ryan is a member, as of 2019, of the Board of Sport Ireland.

References

1972 births
Irish male sprinters
Athletes from the Republic of Ireland
Athletes (track and field) at the 1996 Summer Olympics
Athletes (track and field) at the 2000 Summer Olympics
Olympic athletes of Ireland
Sport Ireland officials
Living people
World Athletics Indoor Championships medalists